Giuseppe "Pino" Brumatti (19 November 1948 – 21 January 2011) was an Italian professional basketball player. In 2009, he was inducted into the Italian Basketball Hall of Fame.

Professional career
During his club career, Brumatti was the FIBA Saporta Cup Finals Top Scorer, in 1976.

Italian national team
As a member of the senior Italian national basketball team, Brumatti competed at the 1972 Summer Olympics, and at the 1976 Summer Olympics, and finished in fourth and fifth place, respectively.

References

External links
FIBA Profile
FIBA Europe Profile

1948 births
2011 deaths
Auxilium Pallacanestro Torino players
Basketball players at the 1972 Summer Olympics
Basketball players at the 1976 Summer Olympics
Mens Sana Basket players
Olimpia Milano players
Olympic basketball players of Italy
Pallacanestro Reggiana players
Scaligera Basket Verona players
Shooting guards